Varanasi division is an administrative geographical unit of Uttar Pradesh state of India. Varanasi is the administrative headquarters of the division. Currently (2023), the division consists of districts of Varanasi, Chandauli, Ghazipur, and Jaunpur and is loosely equivalent to the Benares State.

Districts 
 Varanasi
 Chandauli
 Ghazipur
 Jaunpur

History
In the 18th Century the Mughal Empire was dissolving, and the eastern portion of present-day Uttar Pradesh State came under the control of Saadat Ali Khan I, the first Nawab of Awadh. In 1722, Saadat Ali Khan sublet his southern territories, comprising the present-day districts of Bhadohi, Chandauli, Jaunpur, Ghazipur, Mirzapur, Sonbhadra, and Varanasi, to zamindar Mir Rustam Ali. Mir Rustam Ali was deposed in 1738, and Mansa Ram became zamindar. On Mansa Ram's death in 1739, his son Balwant Singh succeeded him, and established himself raja of Benares State. Balwant Singh and added present-day Ghazipur and Ballia districts to his territories. Balwant Singh died in 1770, and the British intervened to get the Nawab to recognize his son and heir, Chait Singh, as raja. The Nawab of Awadh ceded the territory to the British in 1775, and the British confirmed Chait Singh as ruler.

The British deposed Chait Singh in 1781, and under his heir Mahip Narayan Singh, took administrative control over most of the territory, organizing it into Benares Division, comprising four districts: Benares, Ghazipur, Jaunpur, and Mirzapur. The rajas, later maharajas, of Benares retained certain administrative rights and revenues within the division, and directly governed a portion of the division, known as the Benares Estate. The rajas' principal residence was at Ramnagar, across the Ganges River from Benares. Ballia district was separated from Ghazipur in 1879.

The Division had an area of 10,431 square miles, and was part of the United Provinces of British India. The administrative headquarters was at Benares.

The Division's population was 4,395,252 in 1872, 5,178,005 in 1881, 5,368,480 in 1891, and 5,069,020 in 1901. The decrease from 1891 to 1901 was attributed to an epidemic of fever following disastrous floods in 1894, and to famine and emigration. The 1901 census recorded the division's population as 91% Hindu, not quite 9% Muslim, with small populations of Christians and Sikhs.

In 1911, the Benares Estate, which included two areas governed directly by the Maharajas, was separated from the division to form the Princely State of Benares.

In 1947 India became independent, United Provinces were renamed Uttar Pradesh. In 1948 the Maharaja of Benares acceded to the Government of India, and Benares State was reintegrated into Benares division, with the western portion becoming Bhadohi tehsil and the eastern portion becoming Chania tehsil of Varanasi district.

In 1989 the southeastern portion of Mirzapur district was separated into Sonbhadra district. In 1996 Bhadohi district, also called Sant Ravidas Nagar district, was separated from Varanasi district. In 1997 Chandauli district was separated from Varanasi district.

After 2000, Varanasi division was reduced in size, with the districts of Bhadohi, Mirzapur, and Sonbhadra separated into Mirzapur division, and Ballia district made part of Azamgarh division.

See also
Districts of Uttar Pradesh

References

 
Divisions of Uttar Pradesh